Raymond Agnel (1893–1967) was a French cinematographer.  Agnel began working during the silent era and was active until the 1950s, collaborating with directors such as Jean Renoir and Maurice Tourneur.

Selected filmography

 Sarati the Terrible (1923)
 The Gardens of Murcia (1923)
 The Clairvoyant (1924)
 Terror (1924)
 Madame Sans-Gêne (1925)
 The Nude Woman (1926)
 Palaces (1927)
 Marquitta (1927)
 Madonna of the Sleeping Cars (1928)
 The Wedding March (1929)
 The Three Masks (1929)
 Levy and Company (1930)
 Tenderness (1930)
 The Levy Department Stores (1932)
 The Wonderful Day (1932)
 Buridan's Donkey (1932)
 Southern Cross (1932)
 Fun in the Barracks (1932)
 Toto (1933)
 Arlette et ses papas (1934)
 Ernest the Rebel (1938)
 The West (1938)
 The Porter from Maxim's (1939)
 Love Around the Clock (1943)
 Father Serge (1945)
 The Husbands of Leontine (1947)
 The Village of Wrath (1947)
 Monsieur Chasse (1947)
 Cab Number 13 (1948)
 Good Enough to Eat (1951)
 Darling Anatole (1954)

References

Bibliography
 Fujiwara, Chris. Jacques Tourneur: The Cinema of Nightfall. McFarland, 1998.
 Taranow, Gerda. Sarah Bernhardt: The Art Within the Legend. Princeton University Press, 2015.
 Waldman, Harry. Maurice Tourneur: The Life and Films. McFarland, 2001.

External links

1893 births
1967 deaths
French cinematographers
Mass media people from Marseille